David Boily (born April 28, 1990) is a Canadian former professional cyclist.

In the 2012 Tour of California, Boily held the red jersey awarded for the best climber for the first two stages before fellow Canadian Sebastian Salas took it from him on Stage 3. Boily stated that he was ready to fight to regain the jersey, and he did battle by raking in more points for the mountain classification, but ultimately Salas kept the lead with a total of 65 points, Boily finishing in second position with 48.

Major results

2008
 3rd Overall Tour de l'Abitibi
2009
 3rd  Criterium, Canada Games
 6th Overall Univest Grand Prix
2010
 9th Overall Tour de Beauce
 9th Sparkassen Giro Bochum
2011
 1st  Mountains Classification, Giro di Sardegna
 2nd Overall Tour de l'Avenir
2012
 4th Overall Coupe des Nations Ville Saguenay
2016
 4th Road race, National Road Championships

References

External links
ProCyclingStats profile for David Boily

1990 births
Canadian male cyclists
French Quebecers
Living people
Cyclists from Quebec City